The 2004 Giro del Trentino was the 28th edition of the Tour of the Alps cycle race and was held on 20 April to 23 April 2004. The race started and finished in Arco. The race was won by Damiano Cunego.

General classification

References

2004
2004 in road cycling
2004 in Italian sport